Lisianthius is a genus of flowering plants belonging to the family Gentianaceae.

Its native range is Mexico to Colombia, Caribbean.

Species:

Lisianthius adamsii 
Lisianthius aurantiacus 
Lisianthius auratus 
Lisianthius auriculatus 
Lisianthius axillaris 
Lisianthius brevidentatus 
Lisianthius calciphilus 
Lisianthius capitatus 
Lisianthius cordifolius 
Lisianthius cuspidatus 
Lisianthius domingensis 
Lisianthius exsertus 
Lisianthius glandulosus 
Lisianthius habuensis 
Lisianthius jefensis 
Lisianthius latifolius 
Lisianthius laxiflorus 
Lisianthius longifolius 
Lisianthius meianthus 
Lisianthius nigrescens 
Lisianthius oreopolus 
Lisianthius peduncularis 
Lisianthius perkinsiae 
Lisianthius quichensis 
Lisianthius saponarioides 
Lisianthius seemannii 
Lisianthius silenifolius 
Lisianthius skinneri 
Lisianthius spathulatus 
Lisianthius troyanus 
Lisianthius umbellatus 
Lisianthius viscidiflorus 
Lisianthius weaveri

References

Gentianaceae
Gentianaceae genera